Cess is a hamlet on the River Thurne in the southwestern part of the village of Martham, in Norfolk, England, within The Broads a  member of the National Parks. The population of the hamlet falls within the civil parish of Martham.

References
William White's History, Gazetteer, and Directory of Norfolk 1845

Hamlets in Norfolk
Martham